Crate Entertainment is an American independent video game developer based in Massachusetts.  The company was publicly announced on February 18, 2008 by former members of Iron Lore Entertainment.

History
Following Iron Lore Entertainment's failure to secure funding for its next project, former members of Iron Lore announced they had created a new company on February 18, 2008. Several days later, the company announced it would be working as a contractor Demiurge Studios, providing art and design leadership on one of the company's projects.

On August 19, 2008, Crate announced the acquisition of the Black Legion intellectual property that has been in development at Iron Lore before the studio closed. Iron Lore had attracted significant interest from publishers while pitching Black Legion in late 2007 but had not been able to survive long enough to close a publishing deal. Crate had hoped to pick up on the momentum that Black Legion had gained but due to the U.S. economic recession publishers opted to pass on a large project from the studio.

On July 27, 2009, Crate announced that it acquired a license to use Iron Lore's Titan Quest game engine for their new action role-playing game project. On January 21, 2010 Crate announced that the name of their new project would be Grim Dawn.

On April 18, 2012, Crate gave an update on the Grim Dawn Kickstarter page, where it revealed that the core of the company consists of only two full-time employees, with additional work being provided by former Iron Lore employees when needed.

After the strong success of the Kickstarter campaign (where they received nearly double their funding target in pledges), Crate were able to hire additional staff, several of whom were former employees of the defunct 38 Studios. This allowed Crate to significantly increase the rate of development, and on May 15, 2013 the Grim Dawn alpha (Build 8) was released. On November 5, 2013 the game was released on Steam Early Access. In June 2015, Crate announced that they had hired Eric Sexton, former artist and designer at Blizzard North, stating that his role primarily involved world building and the development of lore.

Grim Dawn was released on February 25, 2016 and received high critical praise. On August 3, 2016, one of the Kickstarter goals - a survival mode - was released entitled "The Crucible" where players battle waves of foes across multiple arenas. An expansion for the game entitled "Ashes of Malmouth" was released on 11 October 2017 adding two more Acts to the game as well as two more masteries: Inquisitor and Necromancer. On March 5, 2018 Crate announced a second expansion for the game entitled "Forgotten Gods" which was released on March 27, 2019.

In a live dev stream on Twitch on 19 April 2019 Crate announced that Forgotten Gods had sold over 100,000 copies and collectively between all of the DLCs and the base game Grim Dawn had sold over 3 million copies.

On 11 January 2021, Crate announced their next project would be a town-building game entitled Farthest Frontier, which the company anticipated would be released as an early access game on Steam some time in 2021.

On 3 December 2021 Crate released the Grim Dawn Definitive Edition on Xbox.

On 25 February 2022 Crate announced that the game and DLC's had sold 7 million copies.

On 9 August 2022 Crate's town building game Farthest Frontier went into early access on Steam.

Games 
 Grim Dawn - 2016
 Farthest Frontier - 2022 (Early Access)

References

Companies based in Massachusetts
Video game companies established in 2008
Video game companies of the United States
Video game development companies
2008 establishments in Massachusetts